Portsmouth Daily Times is a morning newspaper in Scioto County, Ohio with a print circulation of about 10,000. It was first printed in 1852 and printed Monday through Saturday, except Christmas Day. The newspaper is a member of the Associated Press, serving five Ohio counties (Scioto, Adams, Jackson, Lawrence, Pike) and two Kentucky counties (Greenup, Lewis).

The Portsmouth Daily Times is owned by AIM Media Midwest.

On April 10, 2010 the Portsmouth Daily Times printed its final paper on site, laying off its production staff. All editions henceforth will be printed by fellow Heartland paper the Gallipolis Daily Tribune.

In 2012 Versa merged Ohio Community Media, former Freedom papers it had acquired, Impressions Media, and Heartland Publications into a new company, Civitas Media. Civitas Media sold its Ohio papers to AIM Media Midwest in 2017.

Editors
 1986: Kevin Coffey
 1991: Gary Abernathy
 Unknown – 2001: Debbie Allard
 2001 – unknown: Ty Johnston
 Unknown – 2006: Don Willis 
 Unknown: Rick Greene
 2006: Kelly May (interim)
 2007 – unknown: Art Kuhn
 Unknown: Jason Lovins
 Unknown: Deborah Daniels
 Unknown – June 2012: Josh Richardson
 June 2012 – December 2012: Ryan Ottney (interim)
 January 2013 – December 2013: Bob Strickley
 December 2013 – October 2015: Ryan Ottney
 October 2015 – December 2015: Wayne Allen (interim)
 January 2016 – November 2016: Fred Pace
 December 2016 – 2017: Chris Slone

 November 2019 – present: Adam Black

References

External links 
 Portsmouth Daily Times

Newspapers published in Ohio
1852 establishments in Ohio